Muzaffar Shah may refer to:

Rulers of Gujarat Sultanate and from Muzaffarid dynasty
 Muzaffar Shah I (1391-1403, 1404-1411)
 Muzaffar Shah II (1511-1526)
 Muzaffar Shah III (1561-1573, 1584)

Other
 Mudzaffar Shah I of Kedah
 Mudzaffar Shah II of Kedah
 Muzaffar Shah of Malacca
 Muzaffar Shah of Pahang